The Bulgakov Museum in Moscow  is a writer's house museum which commemorates the life and work of author Mikhail Afanasyevich Bulgakov in an apartment where he lived in Moscow, Russia, and in which he set portions of his novel The Master and Margarita. Graffiti, including text from the novel and drawings of its characters, have decorated the external walls and stairwells of the apartment building since the beginning of perestroika. It is located about two blocks from Patriarch Ponds, the scene of the opening chapter of the novel, where the Moscow city government had planned to erect statues commemorating the novel. It is close to Mayakovskaya metro station

The once luxurious rental house, constructed by millionaire Ilya Pigit, owner of the tobacco factory Ducat, was fitted for the first working commune after the revolution. The house, which housed or was visited by dancer Isadora Duncan and poet Sergey Esenin, Alice Koonen and Andrei Bely, Vasily Surikov and bass Fyodor Shaliapin, imaginists and futurists, the members of the artistic group the Jack of Diamonds, and the whole Moscow bohemians, was filled up with the proletariat in the early post-revolutionary years. The studios of the artists Pyotr Konchalovsky and Georgy Yakulov, which were situated in the court of the house 10, were kept, and artistic life continued to pulsate there weekly. What occurred in other apartments – Bulgakov described vividly in the stories № 13 – Elpit Rabcommune Building, The Psalm, The Moonshine Lake, and finally in the novel The Master and Margarita.

The communal flat № 50, where Mikhail Bulgakov and his wife lived during 1921–24, became the prototype of that Odd Flat, where Voland with his court settled up, and where that leading to another measurement mysterious stairs is situated. Years passed, and the stairs of the entrance № 6 became a bewitched place: since the 1970s people go there to sit on those steps, where Annushka found the horse-shoe, to recollect the favourite fragments from the Novel, to sing and to dream. The stairs became one of the unofficial cultural centers of Moscow of 1980–90s. In the attic the “Academy of the Hippie” was organized, and the walls of the entrance were covered with drawings, quotations from Bulgakov’s works, declarations of love to Bulgakov and his characters. During these years, the door of the flat № 50 was closed for the fans of Bulgakov: it housed a design office. But in the 1990s the Bulgakov Fund was based there, and then since April 2007 – the only official Bulgakov Museum in Russia.

Now The Odd Flat is revived and not only shadows of literary personages and former tenants roam here. It is opened for everyone, who wants to find himself inside the novel, to learn more about Bulgakov and his epoch, to communicate with like-minded persons.
Gradually a constant exposition was created on the basis of the collections of Bulgakov’s nieces E.A. Zemskaya and V.M. Svetlaeva, and also V.F. Dimenko’s collection.

Cultural events in “The Odd Flat”: plays of the theatre KomediantЪ, the first half of 20th century jazz concerts and concerts of classical music, exhibitions and subject seminars: culturological seminars are connected with the club New Moscow, literary-philosophical – with the work of the Bulgakov discussion club, and traditional meetings of Aleksey Didurov’s Rock-cabaret.

On December 22, 2006, the museum in Bulgakov's flat was damaged by an anti-satanist protester and disgruntled neighbor, Alexander Morozov.

See also
 Mikhail Bulgakov
 Mikhail Bulgakov Museum
 Heart of a Dog
 The Master and Margarita

References

External links

 Bulgakov museum in Moscow. The Odd Flat 
 Diary of Bulgakov museum in Moscow
 Bulgakov museum in Russian Wikipedia
 Bulgakov Museum on Flickr
  Bulgakov Museum on YouTube
 The Moscow Times, The Master of Irony, James Marson, February 19, 2008

Museums established in 2007
Museums in Moscow
Mikhail Bulgakov
Bulgarov
Literary museums in Russia
2007 establishments in Russia
Cultural heritage monuments of regional significance in Moscow